Guo Shuang (郭爽, born February 26, 1986) is a Chinese professional track cyclist. She won two bronze medals at the 2006 UCI Track Cycling World Championships, in Sprint and Keirin, and two silver medals at the 2007 UCI Track Cycling World Championships, again in Sprint and Keirin.

Guo had an eventful semi-final in the sprint at the 2008 Summer Olympics, having won the first heat and conceded the second to her opponent Anna Meares, the third heat saw Guo come down the banking too steeply and her front wheel slipped from beneath her. The heat was re-run and although Guo won by a few millimetres, she was relegated for coming down the tack and pushing Meares onto the côte d'azure on the final lap. This put Meares through to the final ride-off for gold. Guo went on to win the final ride-off for the bronze against Willy Kanis.

Guo competed in the 2012 Summer Olympics in London. She and Gong Jinjie set a world record of 32.447 seconds in the qualification round of the team sprint event, which they then improved upon with 32.422 in the next round. They went on to finish first in the final against the German team, but were disqualified for an early relay, and were relegated to the silver medal instead.  Guo and Gong's coach Daniel Morelon maintains that the pair were "robbed" of the gold medal, and described it as an "injustice". He complained that the judges refused to provide a "video footage of the race on slow motion", and only provided a "vague explanation" for the infringement they had allegedly committed. However, the British cycling champions Victoria Pendleton and Jessica Varnish, who were also disqualified for a similar reason earlier on in the competition, accepted the judges decision and chose not to claim that they were unfairly robbed of a medal. Pendleton recovered and went on to win a gold medal in the women's keirin event with Guo Shuang coming 2nd.

Palmarès

 2004
 2004 World Cup
 1st Keirin, Moscow
 1st Keirin, Sydney

 2005
2004–2005 World Cup
 2nd Sprint, Sydney
 2nd Keirin, Sydney
2005–2006 World Cup
 3rd Sprint, Manchester

 2006
 World Championships, Bordeaux
 3rd Sprint
 3rd Keirin
 2005–2006 World Cup
 3rd Sprint, Los Angeles
 2nd 500 m, Los Angeles
 2nd Keirin, Los Angeles
 2006–2007 World Cup
 1st Keirin, Sydney
 Asian Games
 1st 500 m
 1st Sprint

 2007
 World Championships, Palma de Mallorca
 2nd Sprint
 2nd Keirin
 2006–2007 World Cup
 3rd 500 m, Los Angeles
 1st Keirin, Los Angeles
 2nd Sprint, Manchester
 3rd Keirin, Manchester
 2007–2008 World Cup
 3rd Team Sprint, Beijing

2008
1st Sprint, Fenioux France Trophy 
2007–2008 World Cup
3rd Sprint, Copenhagen
3rd Sprint, 2008 Summer Olympics

2009
 World Championships, Pruszków
 1st Keirin
2008–2009 World Cup
2nd Keirin, Round 4, Beijing
3rd Keirin, Round 5, Beijing
3rd Team sprint, Round 5, Beijing
2009–2010 UCI Track Cycling World Cup Classics
2nd Keirin, Round 1, Manchester
2nd Sprint, Round 1, Manchester
2nd Keirin, Round 2, Melbourne
2nd Sprint, Round 2, Melbourne

2012
 Olympic Games, London
 2nd Team sprint (with Gong Jinjie)
 3rd Individual Sprint
 2nd Keirin
2014
Grand Prix de Vitesse de Saint-Denis
1st Keirin
1st Sprint
GP von Deutschland im Sprint
2nd Keirin
2nd Sprint
Incheon International Track Competition
2nd Keirin
2nd Sprint
Cottbuser SprintCup
3rd Keirin
3rd Sprint
2015
China Track Cup
1st Sprint
2nd Keirin
3rd Keirin
Melbourne Cup on Wheels
2nd Keirin
2nd Sprint
2nd Keirin, Super Drome Cup
South Australian Grand Prix
3rd Keirin
3rd Sprint
2017
National Track Championships
1st  Keirin
3rd Team Sprint (with Zhong Tianshi)

References

Further reading

External links 

 
 
 
 
 

1986 births
Living people
Chinese female cyclists
Olympic cyclists of China
Olympic silver medalists for China
Olympic bronze medalists for China
Cyclists at the 2008 Summer Olympics
Cyclists at the 2012 Summer Olympics
People from Tongliao
Olympic medalists in cycling
Cyclists from Inner Mongolia
Medalists at the 2012 Summer Olympics
Medalists at the 2008 Summer Olympics
Asian Games medalists in cycling
Cyclists at the 2006 Asian Games
Cyclists at the 2010 Asian Games
UCI Track Cycling World Champions (women)
Asian Games gold medalists for China
Asian Games silver medalists for China
Medalists at the 2010 Asian Games
Universiade medalists in cycling
Medalists at the 2006 Asian Games
Chinese track cyclists
Universiade gold medalists for China
Medalists at the 2011 Summer Universiade